"The Real American Folk Song (is a Rag)" is a 1918 song composed by George Gershwin, with lyrics by Ira Gershwin.

It was the first Gershwin song to be performed on Broadway, where it was introduced by Nora Bayes in the 1918 musical Ladies First.

Notable recordings
Ella Fitzgerald - Ella Fitzgerald Sings the George and Ira Gershwin Songbook (1959) (first recording)

Notes 

Songs with music by George Gershwin
Songs with lyrics by Ira Gershwin
Ella Fitzgerald songs
1918 songs
Songs about music